Siga was a Berber and Roman port located near what is  now Aïn Témouchent, Algeria. Under the Roman Empire, it was part of western Mauretania Caesariensis, bordering Mauretania Tingitana.

History
Siga was a major Mediterranean port in the ancient Kingdom of Numidia. It was located at the western border of the territory of the Masaesyli, a Berber tribe. Their traditional opponents were the Berber confederation of the Maesulians, who ruled the eastern portion.

In the course of the Second Punic War, King Syphax of the Masaesyli allied himself with the Roman Republic and the armies led by Scipio Africanus, while the Maesulians ruled by Masinissa sided with Carthage. With the defeat and capture of Syphax by Masinissa, the western tribes were conquered and gradually absorbed into a united kingdom under his rule. His successors minted coins at Siga with Punic script, in which its name appears as Shigan.

After a temporary decline, the city got some importance inside the Roman Africa, especially with African emperors Septimius Severus and Caracalla. With the Arab conquest, during the second half of the seventh century, disappeared all references to Siga in documented history.

Number of visible or hidden monuments extend on both banks of the river Tafna (called "Siga" in Roman times) including the famous "Numidian mausoleum", the fortified acropolis and some Roman hydraulic and thermal facilities.

Religion
The current Roman Catholic titular see of "Sigus" is probably based on this location, but there was another Sigus in western Numidia.

See also

 Altava
 Mauretania Caesariensis
 Rapidum
 Rusaddir
 Tlemcen

References

Citations

Bibliography
Bowna, Alan. The Cambridge Ancient History: Volume 12, The Crisis of Empire, AD 193-337. Cambridge university Press. Cambridge, 2005
Grimal, P. Les fouilles de Siga, "MEFR", 54, 1937, p. 108-141.
 .
Vuillemot, G. Notes sur un lot d'objets découverts à Siga, "BSGAO" 1953, p. 1-9; Fouille de la nécropole du phare dans I'ile de Rachgoun, Libyca 1955, p. 7-76; Fouilles du Mausolée de Beni-Rhenane en Oranie, "CRAI" 1964, p. 71-95; Siga et son port fluvial, AntAfr 1971, p. 39-86.

Numidia
Archaeological sites in Algeria
Roman towns and cities in Mauretania Caesariensis
Ancient Berber cities
Berber populated places